Kanreapia is a village in Tombolo Pao district, Gowa Regency in South Sulawesi province, Indonesia. Its population is 4304.

Agriculture
The village is known for its production of passion fruits.

Climate
Kanreapia has a subtropical highland climate (Cfb) with moderate rainfall from July to October and heavy to very heavy rainfall from November to June with extremely heavy rainfall in January.

References

 Populated places in South Sulawesi